The Irwell River, New Zealand is a river of the Canterbury Plains, in New Zealand's South Island. A short river, it rises to the southeast of Dunsandel, flowing southeast to enter the broad, shallow Lake Ellesmere.

See also
List of rivers of New Zealand

References

Rivers of Canterbury, New Zealand
Rivers of New Zealand